The area known as Locustville is today a section of the village of Hope Valley in the town of Hopkinton, Rhode Island.

Overview
Once a separate village, it was virtually "taken over" by Hope Valley, its more dominant neighbor to the south. Locustville is still a known place, and its past can still be seen in the present day. An example is Locustville Road, a small road near the center of the village, and Locustville Pond, a large, skinny pond that stretches through much of the present-day borders of the village of Hope Valley.

The site of Locustville is near to the Hope Valley Elementary School on Thelma Drive, which Locustville Road branches off of.

Although the areas which were once Locustville are now known as Hope Valley, the name "Locustville" still is a familiar name among residents, and some residents still identify themselves with the village.

References

Villages in Washington County, Rhode Island
Villages in Rhode Island